Belalan is a village in the District of Vezirköprü, Samsun Province, Turkey.

References

Villages in Vezirköprü District